SAPP may mean:
Sabah Progressive Party
Sodium acid pyrophosphate
Southern African Power Pool